The Pharmaceutical Advertising Advisory Board (PAAB) is a Canadian not-for-profit organization based in Pickering, Ontario. Acting as a pseudo-regulatory body, PAAB offers review and pre-clearance services recognized by Health Canada to pharmaceutical companies and marketing agencies who wish to advertise directly to consumers and/or healthcare professionals. It is financed on a fee-for-service basis.

It works collaboratively with Health Canada, with the federal agency represented as an ex-oficio member on PAAB's board of directors.

History 
PAAB originated in 1976 through a collaboration between the Pharmaceutical Manufacturing Association of Canada and the Canadian Medical Association. Within its first year, the organization had two staff members and had reviewed some 400 applications. As of July 1977, all advertisements printed in the Canadian Medical Association Journal carried the PAAB seal of approval following an examination of their quality and accuracy. In 2004, PAAB's Patient Material Code was revised to include materials provided to patients by healthcare providers as well as adding regulations to standardize advertising over the internet.

As of 2015, PAAB reported completing over 7,000 "first reviews" annually.

Activities 
Advertising materials for all health products in Canada that are intended for healthcare professionals are submitted for review and pre-clearance by PAAB, who prescribes the guidelines for direct marketing to this group. Educational materials and other messaging directed towards consumers on prescription drugs and the medical conditions they treat are reviewed by PAAB and Advertising Standards Canada to ensure compliance with regulatory requirements. While these reviews are not mandatory, PAAB is obligated to forward all safety-related complaints to Health Canada.

Organization

Governance

Board of directors 
PAAB is governed by a board of 12 members, including representation from industry associations Innovative Medicines Canada, BIOTECanada, Association of Medical Advertising Agencies, Canadian Association of Medical Publisher and Consumer Health Products Canada.

 Lorenzo Biondi (Chair)
 Kristin Willemsen - Food, Health & Consumer Products of Canada (Vice-chair)
 Jim Hall - Canadian Association of Medical Publishers (Treasurer)
 Dr. Cecile Bensimon - Canadian Medical Association
 Jeff Connell - Canadian Generic Pharmaceutical Association
 Anita Hammer - BIOTECanada
 Sean McNamara - Canadian Dental Association
 Denis Morrice - Best Medicines Coalition
 Christine O'Reilly - Canadian Healthcare Communications Providers
 Tammy Quinn - Canadian Pharmacists Association
 Agni Shah - Consumers Council of Canada
 Crawford Wright - Innovative Medicines Canada
Notable former members of the board include Susan Eng, former Chair of the Canadian Association of Retired Persons.

Clients 
Clients of PAAB include pharmaceutical companies and advertising agencies working on behalf of pharmaceutical interests.

References 

Non-profit organizations based in Canada